Autodidacticism (also autodidactism) or self-education (also self-learning and self-teaching) is education without the guidance of masters  (such as teachers and professors) or institutions (such as schools). Generally, autodidacts are individuals who choose the subject they will study, their studying material, and the studying rhythm and time. Autodidacts may or may not have formal education, and their study may be either a complement or an alternative to formal education. Many notable contributions have been made by autodidacts.

Etymology 
The related term didacticism defines an artistic philosophy of education.

Terminology 
Various terms are used to describe self-education. One such is heutagogy, coined in 2000 by Stewart Hase and Chris Kenyon of Southern Cross University in Australia; others are self-directed learning and self-determined learning. In the heutagogy paradigm, a learner should be at the centre of their own learning. A truly self-determined learning approach also sees the heutagogic learner exploring different approaches to knowledge in order to learn; there is an element of experimentation underpinned by a personal curiosity.

Modern era
Autodidacticism is sometimes a complement of modern formal education. As a complement to formal education, students would be encouraged to do more independent work. The Industrial Revolution created a new situation for self-directed learners.

Before the twentieth century, only a small minority of people received an advanced academic education. As stated by Joseph Whitworth in his influential report on industry dated from 1853, literacy rates were higher in the United States. However, even in the U.S., most children were not completing high school. High school education was necessary to become a teacher. In modern times, a larger percentage of those completing high school also attended college, usually to pursue a professional degree, such as law or medicine, or a divinity degree.

Collegiate teaching was based on the classics (Latin, philosophy, ancient history, theology) until the early nineteenth century. There were few if any institutions of higher learning offering studies in engineering or science before 1800. Institutions such as the Royal Society did much to promote scientific learning, including public lectures. In England, there were also itinerant lecturers offering their service, typically for a fee.

Prior to the nineteenth century, there were many important inventors working as millwrights or mechanics who, typically, had received an elementary education and served an apprenticeship. Mechanics, instrument makers and surveyors had various mathematics training. James Watt was a surveyor and instrument maker and is described as being "largely self-educated". Watt, like some other autodidacts of the time, became a Fellow of the Royal Society and a member of the Lunar Society. In the eighteenth century these societies often gave public lectures and were instrumental in teaching chemistry and other sciences with industrial applications which were neglected by traditional universities. Academies also arose to provide scientific and technical training.

Years of schooling in the United States began to increase sharply in the early twentieth century. This phenomenon was seemingly related to increasing mechanization displacing child labor. The automated glass bottle-making machine is said to have done more for education than child labor laws because boys were no longer needed to assist. However, the number of boys employed in this particular industry was not that large; it was mechanization in several sectors of industry that displaced child labor toward education. For males in the U.S. born 1886–90, years of school averaged 7.86, while for those born in 1926–30, years of school averaged 11.46.

One of the most recent trends in education is that the classroom environment should cater towards students' individual needs, goals, and interests. This model adopts the idea of inquiry-based learning where students are presented with scenarios to identify their own research, questions and knowledge regarding the area. As a form of discovery learning, students in today's classrooms are being provided with more opportunity to "experience and interact" with knowledge, which has its roots in autodidacticism.

Successful self-teaching can require self-discipline and reflective capability. Some research suggests that the ability to regulate one's own learning may need to be modeled to some students so that they become active learners, while others learn dynamically via a process outside of conscious control. To interact with the environment, a framework has been identified to determine the components of any learning system: a reward function, incremental action value functions and action selection methods. Rewards work best in motivating learning when they are specifically chosen on an individual student basis. New knowledge must be incorporated into previously existing information as its value is to be assessed. Ultimately, these scaffolding techniques, as described by Vygotsky (1978) and problem solving methods are a result of dynamic decision making.

In his book Deschooling Society, philosopher Ivan Illich strongly criticized 20th-century educational culture and the institutionalization of knowledge and learning - arguing that institutional schooling as such is an irretrievably flawed model of education - advocating instead ad-hoc co-operative networks through which autodidacts could find others interested in teaching themselves a given skill or about a given topic, supporting one another by pooling resources, materials, and knowledge.

Secular and modern societies have given foundations for new systems of education and new kinds of autodidacts. As Internet access has become more widespread, websites such as YouTube, Udemy, Udacity and Khan Academy have developed as learning centers for many people to actively and freely learn together. Organizations like The Alliance for Self-Directed Education (ASDE) have been formed to publicize and provide guidance for self-directed education.

In history, philosophy, literature, film and television

The first philosophical claim supporting an autodidactic program to the study of nature and God was in the philosophical novel Hayy ibn Yaqdhan (Alive son of the Vigilant), whose titular hero is considered the archetypal autodidact. The story is a medieval autodidactic utopia, a philosophical treatise in a literary form, which was written by the Andalusian philosopher Ibn Tufail in the 1160s in Marrakesh. It is a story about a feral boy, an autodidact prodigy who masters nature through instruments and reason, discovers laws of nature by practical exploration and experiments, and gains summum bonum through a mystical mediation and communion with God. The hero rises from his initial state of tabula rasa to a mystical or direct experience of God after passing through the necessary natural experiences. The focal point of the story is that human reason, unaided by society and its conventions or by religion, can achieve scientific knowledge, preparing the way to the mystical or highest form of human knowledge.

Commonly translated as "The Self-Taught Philosopher" or "The Improvement of Human Reason", Ibn-Tufayl's story Hayy Ibn-Yaqzan inspired debates about autodidacticism in a range of historical fields from classical Islamic philosophy through Renaissance humanism and the European Enlightenment. In his book Reading Hayy Ibn-Yaqzan: a Cross-Cultural History of Autodidacticism, Avner Ben-Zaken showed how the text traveled from late medieval Andalusia to early modern Europe and demonstrated the intricate ways in which autodidacticism was contested in and adapted to diverse cultural settings.

Autodidacticism apparently intertwined with struggles over Sufism in twelfth-century Marrakesh; controversies about the role of philosophy in pedagogy in fourteenth-century Barcelona; quarrels concerning astrology in Renaissance Florence in which Pico della Mirandola pleads for autodidacticism against the strong authority of intellectual establishment notions of predestination; and debates pertaining to experimentalism in seventeenth-century Oxford. Pleas for autodidacticism echoed not only within close philosophical discussions; they surfaced in struggles for control between individuals and establishments.

In the story of Black American self-education, Heather Andrea Williams presents a historical account to examine Black American's relationship to literacy during slavery, the Civil War and the first decades of freedom. Many of the personal accounts tell of individuals who have had to teach themselves due to racial discrimination in education.

In architecture

Many successful and influential architects, such as Mies van der Rohe, Frank Lloyd Wright, Violet-Le-Duc, Tadao Ando were self-taught.

There are very few countries allowing autodidacticism in architecture today. The practice of architecture or the use of the title "architect", are now protected in most countries.

Self-taught architects have generally studied and qualified in other fields such as engineering or arts and crafts. Jean Prouvé was first a structural engineer. Le Corbusier had an academic qualification in decorative arts. Tadao Ando started his career as a draftsman, and Eileen Gray studied fine arts.

When a political state starts to implement restrictions on the profession, there are issues related to the rights of established self-taught architects. In most countries the legislation includes a grandfather clause, authorising established self-taught architects to continue practicing. In the UK, the legislation, allowed self-trained architects with 2 years of experience to register. In France, it allowed self-trained architects with 5 years of experience to register. In Belgium, the law allowed experienced self-trained architects in practice to register. In Italy, it allowed self-trained architects with 10 years of experience to register. In The Netherlands, the "wet op de architectentitel van 7 juli 1987" along with additional procedures, allowed architects with 10 years of experience and architects aged 40 years old or over, with 5 years of experience, to access the register.

However, other sovereign states chose to omit such a clause, and many established and competent practitioners were stripped of their professional rights. In the Republic of Ireland, a group named "Architects' Alliance of Ireland" is defending the interests of long-established self-trained architects who were recently deprived of their rights to practice as per Part 3 of the Irish Building Control Act 2007.

Theoretical research such as Architecture of Change, Sustainability and Humanity in the Built Environment or older studies such as Vers une Architecture from Le Corbusier describe the practice of architecture as an environment changing with new technologies, sciences, and legislation. All architects must be autodidacts to keep up to date with new standards,  regulations, or methods.

Self-taught architects such as Eileen Gray, Luis Barragán, and many others, created a system where working is also learning, where self-education is associated with creativity and productivity within a working environment.

While he was primarily interested in naval architecture, William Francis Gibbs learned his profession through his own study of battleships and ocean liners. Through his life he could be seen examining and changing the designs of ships that were already built, that is, until he started his firm Gibbs and Cox.

Future role
The role of self-directed learning continues to be investigated in learning approaches, along with other important goals of education, such as content knowledge, epistemic practices and collaboration. As colleges and universities offer distance learning degree programs and secondary schools provide cyber school options for K-12 students, technology provides numerous resources that enable individuals to have a self-directed learning experience. Several studies show these programs function most effectively when the "teacher" or facilitator is a full owner of virtual space to encourage a broad range of experiences to come together in an online format. This allows self-directed learning to encompass both a chosen path of information inquiry, self-regulation methods and reflective discussion among experts as well as novices in a given area. Furthermore, massive open online courses (MOOCs) make autodidacticism easier and thus more common.

A 2016 Stack Overflow poll reported that due to the rise of autodidacticism, 69.1% of software developers appear to be self-taught.

Notable individuals

Notable autodidacts can be broadly grouped in the following areas:
 Artists and authors
 Actors, musicians, and other artists
 Architects
 Engineers and inventors
 Scientists, historians, and educators

See also

References

Further reading
 Bach, James Marcus. Secrets of a Buccaneer-Scholar: Self Education and the Pursuit of Passion. 
 Brown, Resa Steindel. The Call to Brilliance: A True Story to Inspire Parents and Educators. 
 Cameron, Brent and Meyer, Barbara. SelfDesign: Nurturing Genius Through Natural Learning. 
 Hailey, Kendall. The Day I Became an Autodidact. 
 Llewellyn, Grace. The Teenage Liberation Handbook: How to Quit School and Get a Real Life and Education. 
 Rancière, Jacques. The Ignorant Schoolmaster: Five Lessons in Intellectual Emancipation. Stanford Univ. Press, 1991. 
 Solomon, Joan. The Passion to Learn: An Inquiry into Autodidactism. 
 Stark, Kio. Don't Go Back to School: A Handbook for Learning Anything. 2013. 
 
 
 McAuliffe, M.; Hargreaves, D.; Winter, A.; G Chadwick, G., "Does pedagogy still rule?", Australasian Journal of Engineering Education, Vol 15 No 1, Institution of Engineers Australia, 2009
 Hase, Stewart; Kenyon, Chris, "Heutagogy: A Child of Complexity Theory", Complicity: An International Journal of Complexity and Education, Volume 4 (2007), Number 1, pp. 111–118

External links
 

Learning methods
Alternative education
Self-care